Monocracy is a form of government and political system based on the personal rule of an individual without a specific origin, legitimacy and rules for exercising and transferring power. It can also take the form of a dictatorship exercised in the name of a republic or democracy, or in the name of the people. The term doesn't refer to traditional monarchy and has a broader meaning.

According to the etymology and literal meaning, the term monocracy includes all varieties of autocracy; in practice, however, the meaning narrowed down to non-monarchic and non-dynastic forms has been adopted also in the political science literature; while monarchy is a system in which "the rule of one" is a universally accepted principle (archy), justified by tradition and clarified by a number of rules defining the order and mode of assuming power, exercising it and transferring it, in a monocracy the ruler can come to power in different, unpredictable, case-by-case, both legal and illegal ways (his power comes "out of nowhere"); the fact that he holds personal power may or may not be officially proclaimed and promulgated, and the question of succession remains open; "accidentality" in this case may also mean a situation in which the ruler becomes a monocrat against his original aspirations and intentions, as a result of the internal logic of the development of events, to which he contributed to some extent; whatever title he adopts, he is always a "new prince" (il principe nuovo) in the sense defined by N. Machiavelli as the one who did not inherit power, but gained it "by others or by his own weapons, by luck or personal valor" (Prince, I, 1).

Monocratic systems occur in all eras and civilizations, but the rule is their appearance in "transitional" times of crisis of the previously dominant form of system, e.g. Greek aristocratic or democratic polis, Roman republic, modern parliamentary democracy. In earlier times, monocracies were, among others: Greek tyrannies, Roman dictatorships for an unlimited period (in perpetuum) at the end of the republic (Sulli, then Caesar), O. Cromwell's protectorate in the Commonwealth of England, Napoleon Bonaparte's consulate at the end of the French First Republic ; in the twentieth century, monocracies appeared both in authoritarian systems (including J. Piłsudski in Poland, A. Salazar in Portugal, F. Franco in Spain, Ph. Pétain in the French state, G. Vargas in Brazil, J.D. Peron in Argentina), as well as totalitarian (B. Mussolini in Italy, A. Hitler in Germany, J. Stalin in the USSR, Mao Zedong in communist China, Kim Il Sung in North Korea); a position close to monocratic was also achieved by some leaders in democratic systems (T.G. Masaryk in Czechoslovakia, F.D. Roosevelt in the USA, Ch. de Gaulle in France).

Monocracy can arise in states which are formally democratic but de facto dictatorships.

References

Dictatorship